The island of Menorca in the Mediterranean Sea has been invaded on numerous occasions. The first recorded invasion occurred in 252 BC, when the Carthaginians arrived. The name of the island's chief city, Mahón (now Maó), appears to derive from the name of the Punic leader Mago Barca. The name of the island is of Latin origin, and dates from after the Roman conquest, led by Quintus Caecilius Metellus in 123 BC, during a campaign which earned him the agnomen Balearicus.

The island was briefly subsumed under the Vandal kingdom of Africa around 427, but it was eventually reconquered by the Romans and incorporated in the Byzantine Empire. It was an obscure province increasingly outside the sphere of Byzantine influence for the next four centuries. Around 859 a Viking incursion destroyed or damaged many Byzantine churches. In 903 the island was invaded by the Emirate of Córdoba, resulting in the introduction of Islam and renewed contacts with the Iberian peninsula. The taifa of Menorca, the last Muslim state on the island, accepted the authority of the Crown of Aragon in 1231–32, and was finally conquered in 1287–88; its Muslim population being either ransomed or enslaved. The island came under attack from the Ottoman Empire in 1535, when Mahón was sacked, and again in 1558, when Mahón and Ciutadella were plundered.

During the War of the Spanish Succession, the island was taken by the French in 1707 with no military action, but in 1708 it was captured by the British, whose sovereignty was recognised in the Treaty of Utrecht (1713). The French returned in 1756, beating the British at sea, and capturing Fort St Philip. In 1763, at the end of the Seven Years' War, the French ceded the island back to Britain. During the American Revolutionary War, the French sided with Spain and invaded Menorca in 1781. It was a part of Spain until being reconquered by the British in 1798, during the French Revolutionary Wars. Britain handed Menorca back to Spain under the Treaty of Amiens (1802), having chosen to keep Malta as a Mediterranean base instead.

During the Spanish Civil War, the island remained loyal to the Republic, but was captured by the Nationalists in February 1939.

Main invasions
Sack of Mahón (1535)
Ottoman invasion of the Balearic islands (1558)
Capture of Menorca (1708)
Battle of Menorca (1756)
Siege of Fort St Philip (1756)
Invasion of Menorca (1781)
Capture of Menorca (1798)
Battle of Menorca (1939)

Notes

External links
Historia de Menorca, menorca.org- accessed 2007-12-17

History of Menorca
Invasions, Minorca